Salinibacillus xinjiangensis is a Gram-positive, endospore-forming, halophilic and rod-shaped bacterium from the genus of Salinibacillus which has been isolated from a lake from the Xinjiang Uyghur Autonomous Region in China.

References

External links
Type strain of Salinibacillus xinjiangensis at BacDive -  the Bacterial Diversity Metadatabase

 

Bacillaceae
Bacteria described in 2014